Christotokos (Greek: , English: Christ-bearer) is a Greek title of Mary, the mother of Jesus, used historically by non-Ephesian (or "Nestorian") Church of the East. Its literal English translations also include the one who gives birth to Christ. Less literal translations include Mother of Christ.

See also 
 Nestorianism
 Theotokos

References

External links
 Theotokos article on the Orthodox Wiki

Anglican Mariology
Titles of Mary
Christology
Ancient Christian controversies
Christian terminology